Syde (stylised as SŸDE ) are an Australian indie electronic duo consisting of Will Hyde and Mitch Stephens. The name SŸDE "is combination of their last names" with the umlaut used to make them "sound European".

SŸDE released their debut single "Orbit" in 2016. It features Ashe In 2017, SŸDE  were Triple J Unearthed High Finalist. and signed with Dew Process.

In November 2017, they released the single "About the Clouds" featuring Olivia Reid, described by Andy Gorel of C-Heads as "A comfortable blend of indie folk and electronic pop." "About the Clouds" was used in a Visa advertising campaign in early 2018.

In July 2018 SŸDE released "Follow" Me featuring Evan Klar.

In August 2019, SŸDE released "Her Touch", with the duo explaining, "The song is about passion, feeling passion and then the sensation of not caring once you’ve lost it. We wanted to touch on the craziness of feeling love so intensely but then the flip side when you're out of love. It’s like you completely forget the feelings you once had when you were in that relationship."

Members
 Will Hyde – keyboard and producer
 Mitch Stephens – guitar and producer

Discography

Singles

Awards and nominations

J Awards
The J Awards are an annual series of Australian music awards that were established by the Australian Broadcasting Corporation's youth-focused radio station Triple J. They commenced in 2005.

! 
|-
| J Awards of 2017
| themselves
| Unearthed High
| 
|
|}

References

Australian indie pop groups
Musical groups established in 2016
Musical groups from Melbourne